CrossOver is a Microsoft Windows compatibility layer available for Linux, macOS, and ChromeOS. This compatibility layer enables many Windows-based applications to run on Linux operating systems, macOS, or ChromeOS.

CrossOver is developed by CodeWeavers and based on Wine, an open-source Windows compatibility layer. CodeWeavers modifies the Wine source code, applies compatibility patches, adds configuration tools that are more user-friendly, automated installation scripts, and provides technical support. All changes made to the Wine source code are covered by the LGPL and publicly available. CodeWeavers maintains an online database listing how well various Windows applications perform under CrossOver.

Versions

CrossOver Linux
CrossOver Linux is the original version of CrossOver. It aims to properly integrate with the GNOME and KDE desktop environments so that Windows applications will run seamlessly on Linux distributions. Prior to version 6 it was called CrossOver Office. CrossOver Linux was originally offered in Standard and Professional editions. CrossOver Linux Standard was designed for a single user account on a single machine. CrossOver Linux Professional provided enhanced deployment and management features for corporate users, as well as multiple user accounts per machine. With the release of CrossOver Linux 11 in 2012 these different editions have all merged into a single CrossOver Linux product.

CrossOver Mac
In 2005 Apple announced a transition from PowerPC to Intel processors in their computers, which allowed CodeWeavers to develop a Mac OS X version of CrossOver Office called 'CrossOver Mac'

CrossOver Mac was released on January 10, 2007. With the release of CrossOver Mac 7 on June 17, 2008, CrossOver Mac was divided into Standard and Pro editions like CrossOver Linux. The Standard version included six months of support and upgrades, while the Pro version included one year of support and upgrades, along with a free copy of CrossOver Games. With the release of CrossOver Mac 11 in 2012 these different editions were all merged into a single CrossOver Mac product.

In 2019, macOS Catalina went 64-bit only and eliminated support for 32-bit programs and libraries. In December 2019 Codeweavers released CrossOver 19, providing support for 32 bit Windows applications on an operating system with no 32 bit libraries solving this problem. The technique, known as "wine32on64", requires using modified LLVM to build additional thunk code that allows running 32-bit programs in a 64-bit wine.

Component's versions details 
As example of the complexity of the final package:
 CrossOver v19.0.0 (2019): Wine v4.12
 CrossOver v20.0.0 (2020): Wine v5.0
 CrossOver v21.0.0 (2021): Wine v6.0, DXVK builtin (optional) v1.5, DXVK upstream (optional) v1.7
 CrossOver v21.1.0 (2021): Wine v6.3, DXVK builtin (optional) v1.5, DXVK upstream (optional) v1.7
 CrossOver v21.2.0 (2022): Wine v6.3, DXVK builtin (optional) v1.5, DXVK upstream (optional) v1.7
 CrossOver v22.0.0 (2022): Wine v7.0, VKD3D 1.3, DXVK builtin (optional) v1.5, DXVK upstream (optional) v1.8
 CrossOver v22.1.0 (2023): Wine v7.7, VKD3D 1.5, DXVK builtin (optional) v1.7, DXVK upstream (optional) v1.8

Discontinued products
A standard copy of CrossOver now includes the functionality of CrossOver Games, CrossOver Standard, and CrossOver Professional editions. These older individual versions of Crossover have since been retired.

CrossOver Games, announced on 10 March 2008, was a product intended to let users play a broad range of games by providing current Wine patches. The expectation was that it would update on a weekly to monthly schedule in order to incorporate the latest Wine programming work being accepted. In contrast the general CrossOver Office product focused more on stability and productivity software, and had a much slower beta and release schedule. CrossOver Games wasn't able to release updates with enough frequency to justify its separate production track and was discontinued in 2012. It was merged back into a unified CrossOver product.

CrossOver Server was a specialized version of CrossOver Linux which allowed Windows applications to run on thin-client systems. It was discontinued in 2007 as many of its features were present in the CrossOver Linux Pro edition.

Software giveaway
On October 28, 2008 as the result of the Lame Duck Challenge, Codeweavers gave all of their products away for free. Codeweavers' main page was temporarily replaced due to the day's unusually high traffic. According to CodeWeavers at least 750,000 product registrations were given away during October 28.

On October 31, 2012, CodeWeavers had a second software giveaway, this one entitled "Flock the Vote". CodeWeavers promised to have such a giveaway if 100,000 American voters would promise to vote on election day, in a nonpartisan bid to encourage activism. More than 100,000 people pledged, so CodeWeavers allowed any person in the world to download and register a copy of CrossOver Linux or CrossOver Mac.

See also
 Wine
 WINE@Etersoft
 PlayOnMac
 PlayOnLinux
 Wine-Doors
 Darwine

References

External links
 

Compatibility layers
Linux emulation software
Software derived from or incorporating Wine
Unix emulation software
MacOS emulation software
Wine (software)
Python (programming language) software